Zhongguancun is a major technology hub in Haidian District, Beijing, China.

Zhongguancun occupies a band between the northwestern Third Ring Road and the northwestern Fourth Ring Road, in the northwestern part of Beijing. Zhongguancun is sometimes known as "China's Silicon Valley". The place is also the center of Beijing-Tianjin-Shijiazhuang Hi-Tech Industrial Belt.

History

Chen Chunxian envisioned Zhongguancun, which then became a well-known technology hub 30 years later. Chunxian, a member of the Chinese Academy of Sciences (CAS), conceived of a Silicon Valley in China following a government-sponsored trip to Boston and Silicon Valley, United States.

Zhongguancun became known as "Electronics Avenue" from the early 1980s on, due to its information technology markets along a central, crowded street.

Zhongguancun was recognized by the central government of China in 1988, and officially named "Beijing High-Technology Industry Development Experimental Zone". In 1999, Zhongguancun became the "Zhongguancun Science & Technology Zone", with seven parks: Haidian, Fengtai, Changping, Electronics City (in Chaoyang), Yizhuang, Desheng, and Jianxiang. The original Zhongguancun became known as Haidian Park of the Zhongguancun Zone.

Notable education and research centres
Zhongguancun has an association with China's two most prestigious universities, Peking University and Tsinghua University, along with the Chinese Academy of Sciences, all of which are in close proximity.
Secondary schools in Zhongguancun include Affiliated High School of Peking University and High School Affiliated to Renmin University of China.

Government infrastructure
The Zhongguancun Administrative Committee oversees the city.

The State Administration of Foreign Experts Affairs (SAFEA) has its headquarters in Zhongguancun.

Notable companies and landmarks

Hailong Market, Guigu Market, Taipingyang Market, Dinghao Market and Kemao Market are prominent IT and electronics technology bazaars, noted for "shops with a shop", where bargaining is the norm. According to the 2004 Beijing Statistical Yearbook, there were over 12,000 high-tech enterprises operating in Zhongguancun's seven parks, with 489,000 technicians employed.

The most notable companies that grew up in Zhongguancun are Stone Group, Founder Group, and Lenovo Group, each founded during 1984 to 1985. Stone was the first successful technology company to be operated by private individuals outside of the government of China. Founder is a technology company that spun off Peking University. Lenovo Group spun off from Chinese Academy of Sciences with Liu Chuanzhi, a hero of Zhongguancun and current chairman, eventually taking the helm. Lenovo purchased IBM's PC division with $1.75 billion in 2005, making it the world's third-largest PC maker. Both Founder and Lenovo Group maintain strong connections to their academic backers, who are significant shareholders.

Many world-renowned technology companies built their Chinese headquarters and research centers in Zhongguancun Technology Park, such as Google, Intel, AMD, Oracle Corporation, Motorola, Cogobuy Group, IBM, MySpace, Sony, Solstice, and Ericsson. Microsoft has built its Chinese research headquarters in the park that costs $280 million and can accommodate 5000 employees, which was completed in April, 2011, and now houses  Microsoft Research Asia.

The development center of Loongson, which is China's first general-purpose microprocessor design, is also in the Zhongguancun area.

Everbright International has its Beijing office in the Beijing International Building (北京国际大厦) in Zhongguancun.

Mny conferences are held in this location, including the annual ChinICT conference - which is the largest Information technology Development and Entrepreneurship event in China.

A frequent tourist destination is the Haidian Christian Church, designed by Hamburg-based architects Gerkan, Marg and Partners.

Transportation

Beijing Subway Line 4 runs through the Zhongguancun area with stops at Zhongguancun Station and Haidianhuangzhuang Station.  Haidianhuangzhuang is also a transfer station with Line 10.  In addition, Zhongguancun is served by many of Beijing's buses.

See also
List of technology centers around the world
China Beijing Equity Exchange
China Milan Equity Exchange
 Zhongguancun Administrative Committee
 Zhongguancun Subdistrict

Further reading

References

External links

Article with photos of Zhongguancun's development since the 1980s
Obituary for Chen Chunxian
Zhongguancun Management Committee
Zhongguancun Parks
Travel Introduction to Zhongguancun
Michael Rogers MSNBC Article on Zhongguancun
Hilon Market Building (in Chinese) 

 
Economy of Beijing
Haidian District
Science parks in China
Information technology places
Neighbourhoods of Beijing
Township-level divisions of Beijing